Morgan Christie is an Australian film director and music video director, film editor and producer. He is a graduate of the Australian Film Television and Radio School with specialization in Cinematography and Digital Media and alumni of the Berlinale Talent Campus.

Career
Christie has directed music videos for artists on major and independent labels in Australia which have received two Australian Directors Guild award nominations for "Nothing Lasts Forever" by The Living End and "Miracle Cure" by Something For Kate. He was also nominated by the Australian Screen Editors guild in the category of Best Editing in a Music Video.

He began his career as a commercials director as a recipient of the Next Big Thing Award from Getty Images and has since directed award-winning campaigns for major international brands including General Mills Yoplait, a Silver Unilever award for his PanAsian OMO campaign was also awarded at the Cannes Lions Advertising Awards for his commercial work for Swiss electronics brand, Logitech in 2010

He is credited as the development producer of the Nine Network series Underbelly Razor, the fourth season based on the violent razor gangs of East Sydney in the early 1920s led by notorious crime bosses, Kate Leigh and Tilly Devine. The TV series was based on the book, "Razor" by Larry Writer (PanMacMillan) whose underlying rights are owned by Silverspell Pty Ltd.

Filmography

Music videos

Short films

References

Australian film directors
Australian Film Television and Radio School alumni
Year of birth missing (living people)
Living people